Falun is a city in Sweden.

Falun may also refer to:

Places 
 Falun Municipality, a municipality in Sweden, its seat is the city of Falun
 Falun, Alberta
 Falun, Kansas
 Falun, Wisconsin
 Falun Township (disambiguation)
 Falun, Sichuan (发轮), a town in Zizhong County, Sichuan, China

Other uses 
 Falun (symbol), an emblem used by the Falun Gong spiritual group
 Falun (geology)